Hypocoena is a genus of moths of the family Noctuidae.

Species
 Hypocoena basistriga (McDunnough, 1933)
 Hypocoena inquinata (Guenée, 1852)
 Hypocoena rufostrigata (Packard, 1867)
 Hypocoena sofiae (Mustelin, 2006)
 Hypocoena stigmatica (Eversmann, 1855)

Recent taxonomic changes
 Hypocoena enervata is now Photedes enervata (Guenée, 1852)
 Hypocoena defecta is now Photedes defecta (Grote, 1874)

Hypocoena orphnina is now considered a synonym of Hypocoena enervata. Hypocoena variana is now considered a synonym of Hypocoena inquinata.

References
Natural History Museum Lepidoptera genus database
Hypocoena at funet

Apameini